Class of Nuke 'Em High Part 2: Subhumanoid Meltdown is a 1991 American science-fiction action horror comedy film, and the first sequel to the 1986 film Class of Nuke 'Em High. There are no characters carried over from the first film, possibly because of the sequel's production being in Yuma, Arizona as opposed to the original's New York-based production.

Plot
Tromaville's nuclear reactor has been rebuilt and the Nukamama Corporation that funded it has incorporated a new college, the Tromaville Institute of Technology (T.I.T.), inside the design, as an effort to atone for the events of the first film. Located inside the nuclear plant, is where Professor Holt who has perfected a race of 'Sub-humanoids'; Living beings without emotions, who have been created and programmed to perform menial tasks. When school reporter Roger Smith meets a beautiful subhumanoid named Victoria, they fall in love. However, the creatures have a tendency to go into spontaneous meltdown. Roger is now determined to save Victoria from this messy fate, but first he'll have to face the giant mutant squirrel, Tromie, who attacks Tromaville tech in the climax.

Cast
 Brick Bronsky as Roger Smith
 Lisa Gaye as Professor Melvina Holt
 Lily Hayes-Kaufman as young Melvina Holt
 Leesa Rowland as Victoria
 Michael Kurtz as Yoke
 Scott Resnick as Dean Okra
 Jacquelyn Rene Moen as Diane / Bald Subhumanoid
 M. Davis as Murray
 Phil Rivo as Harvey / Malathion Man
 Mark Richardson as Motorcycle Man / 674IF
 Erica Frank as Tour guide
 Thomas Perry as The Toxic Avenger
 Michael Herz and Lloyd Kaufman (uncredited) as Voices of Helicopter pilots

Reception

TV Guide liked the film, finding it a good example of the Troma Studios style of filmmaking. It enjoyed the social commentary and noted it had some decent effects. It also noted that the success of the jokes in the film was frentic.

Sequels
A third film, entitled The Good, the Bad and the Subhumanoid, was released in 1994. A fourth installment, Return to Nuke 'Em High: Volume 1, was released in 2013.

References

External links
 

1991 films
1990s English-language films
1991 horror films
1990s comedy horror films
1990s science fiction horror films
American comedy horror films
American independent films
American satirical films
American science fiction horror films
Films shot in Los Angeles
American sequel films
Troma Entertainment films
1991 comedy films
Punk films
1990s American films